Mello Nunatak is an isolated nunatak standing  east of Mount Staley in the Freyberg Mountains of Antarctica, in the northeastern part of Evans Névé. It was mapped by the United States Geological Survey from surveys and U.S. Navy air photos, 1960–64, and was named by the Advisory Committee on Antarctic Names for chief engineman Gerald L. Mello, U.S. Navy, petty officer in charge of Hallett Station, summer 1966–67, and a member of the McMurdo Station winter party of 1967.

References

Nunataks of Victoria Land
Pennell Coast